Indian Register of Shipping (IRClass) is an internationally recognised, independent ship classification society, founded in India in 1975. It is a public limited company incorporated under Section 25 of the Indian Companies Act 1956 (Section 8 of Indian Companies Act 2013). It is a Non-Profit organisation, Public undertaking and a member of the 11 member International Association of Classification Societies (IACS). It was inducted into IACS along with Croatian Register of Shipping (CRS) and Polish Register of Shipping (PRS).

Today, IRClass acts on behalf of the Maritime Administration of the Government of India as the sole authority for final assignment of Load Lines in Indian flag vessels and also as the security organisation that determines compliance under the International Ship and Port Facility Security Code (ISPS) code for Indian flag ships and port facilities.

IRClass provides independent third party technical inspection and certification services for all types of ships, marine craft and structures. These services have also been expanded to cover a range of offshore and industrial projects and are designed to meet ISO 9001 specifications (the International Standard on Quality Management Systems).

Indian Register of Shipping was established as a public limited company in March 1975 and has been providing ship classification services. In addition, they establish standards and formulate rules for the construction and maintenance of ships, amphibious installation, marine equipment and industrial and general engineering equipment. They also undertake approval of designs, survey and to issue reports on land installations, machinery, materials and apparatus of all kinds.

History
Indian Register of Shipping was founded in 1975 to act as a catalyst of self-regulation by Indian Shipping Industries and to serve as a forum for research and development.

Here are some important milestones in its history

 1975 – IRS was established and registered under section 25 (erstwhile section 8) of the Companies Act 1956 as not for profit public limited company. In the same year dual class agreements for mutual cooperation were signed with the American Bureau of Shipping, Lloyd's Register of Shipping and Det Norske Veritas, the first register of ships was also published in the same year.
 1977 - IRS published its first rule book.
 1979 - IRS was authorised by the Indian Government to assign load lines on Indian flag vessels. In the same year it diversified its activities to include inspection for land based industries.
 1983 – dual class agreement with Bureau Veritas.
 1984 – dual class agreement with Germanischer Lloyd.
 1991 – IRS became an associate of the IACS.
 1997 – IRS was appointed by the Maritime Administration of the Indian Government as the sole authority for final assignment of Load Line in Indian flag vessels.
 1998 – IRS was appointed as the only recognised organisation for conducting audits under the ISM Code for all Indian flag vessels.
 2000 – The International Underwriting Association under the Institution Classification Clause recognises the IRS. By virtue of this ships classified under the IRS would not attract any extra insurance. This was a first for an Associate Member.
 2004 - The International Ship and Port Facility Security Code (ISPS) came into effect. IRS was appointed as the sole recognised security organisation to determine compliance under the code for Indian flag ships and port facilities.
 2010 – IRS becomes a full member of IACS.
 2016 – IRS receives recognition from European Commission EC.
 2018 – IRS takes over as Vice Chairman of IACS.
 2019 – IRS elected as Chairman of IACS.

Organisation & Management

IRS is a non-profit making organisation. All funds generated from fees for classification services are used solely for the performance of such services. A surplus of receipts in any one year is used for the extension and improvement of the services, including research and development. It has a Committee of Management with representatives from the Ministry and from each industry segment that uses its services. IRS has 25 offices located all over India. It has overseas offices at Bangladesh, China, Greece, Indonesia, Netherlands, Qatar, Singapore, South Korea, Sri Lanka, Thailand, UAE, UK and United States.

Services

Statutory Services

IRS carries out statutory design appraisal, surveys and certification work on behalf of Flag States, when so authorised by the Governments of such states via the International Maritime Organisation Conventions and Codes . The four major IMO conventions are:

 International Convention on Loadline
 International Convention for the safety of Life at Sea (SOLAS)
 International Tonnage Convention
 International Convention on Maritime Pollution Prevention (MARPOL)

Non-Classification Services

Specification Services
IRS surveyors who are seconded in to the owners for technical advisory and supervisory services operate independently. IRS specification services have been used extensively by various ship owners including national administrations, port authorities, oil companies etc. Specification services are provided for pre-contract as well as post-contract stages.

Pre-contract services include:

 Advice for preparation of inquiry documents for tendering
 Appraisal of tender bids from shipbuilders
 Power estimation
 Fuel consumption, endurance and capacities for consumables
 Trim and stability calculations
 General layout and space concepts
 Cargo capacities and handling arrangements
 Selection of propulsion and auxiliary machinery
 Advice for painting and corrosion protection scheme.

Post-contract services

Design appraisal is done at the early stages to ensure that proposed arrangement conforms to the agreed specification. The design appraisal could cover model-testing program for power estimation, sea keeping and maneuvering.

Generally the following plans are verified for ensuring compliance with specification:

 Hull and superstructure
 All machinery systems
 Loading conditions
 Tank arrangement and capacities
 Electrical and control system
 Painting specification and corrosion control system
 Communication systems and navigational equipment
 Safety equipment and life saving appliances

Supervision during all stages of construction

At the shipyard, comprehensive supervision is provided during all stages of constructions including tests and trials. Owners are appraised at monthly or agreed intervals about progress, deviations, from specifications and other pertinent facts of owners interest. Visits are arranged to the sub-contractor's work sites to inspect major items of machinery and equipment to ensure compliance with specifications and agreed standards of workmanship.

Supervision during major modification and repair

This includes a broad range of focus areas like:

 Examination of existing plans of a vessel to assess its suitability for modifications
 Examination of the existing condition of a vessel
 Assisting owners in evaluation of contractors
 Supervision of modification work

Damage Surveys

Damage surveys on hull, machinery, equipment and permanent fittings on classed or nonclassed ships are done at the request of ship owners or any other interested parties such as underwriters, and factual reports are issued to the parties.

This service includes survey of damage:

 To establish nature, extent and cause of damage
 Recommendation of repairs
 Supervision and certification of repair done
 Final endorsement of repair bills.

See also 

 Classification Society
 International Association of Classification Societies
 International Maritime Organization
 Coastal India
 Exclusive economic zone of India
 Fishing in India
 Outline of India

References

Ship classification societies
Shipping in India
1975 establishments in Maharashtra